The 2013 Bahrain Grand Prix (formally known as the 2013 Formula 1 Gulf Air Bahrain Grand Prix) was a Formula One motor race held on 21 April 2013 at the Bahrain International Circuit in Sakhir, Bahrain. Mercedes' Nico Rosberg started the race from pole. Sebastian Vettel won the race, with Lotus F1 drivers Kimi Räikkönen and Romain Grosjean completing the podium meaning the top 3 finishers were identical to the 2012 event in the same order.

Contested over 57 laps, it was the fourth round of the 2013 season, and the ninth time that the Bahrain Grand Prix had been held as a round of the Formula One World Championship. The controversial race went ahead despite ongoing protests which had been taking place since the cancellation of the 2011 event. This race also marked the 200th Grand Prix for Mark Webber.

This was also the last Bahrain Grand Prix to take place during the daytime, as the event switched to a night race from the 2014 race onwards.

Report

Background
Tyre supplier Pirelli had originally planned to bring their hard and soft compounds of tyre to the race, to be designated as the prime and the option respectively. However, the teams experienced problems with the soft compound at the Chinese Grand Prix, with the tyres degrading after just seven laps, which prompted Pirelli to alter their allocation for the Bahrain Grand Prix, changing the options from the soft compound to the medium. Before the race, a minute of silence was held as a mark of respect for those who had lost their lives in the Boston Marathon bombings six days earlier.

Anti-government protests

In the context of the ongoing Bahraini uprising, public protests also occurred over the 2013 staging of the race, after the 2011 event was cancelled and the 2012 event went ahead despite efforts by demonstrators to disrupt the race. According to Reuters, the race went ahead "largely unhindered" by the protests. Reflecting on the changes in the government strategy compared to 2012, they concluded that the public relations battle over this year's race had produced a stalemate, reflecting the situation in the opposition movement generally.

Race
At the start, Nico Rosberg kept his lead into the first corner, with Vettel and Alonso keeping close company. On the second lap, Vettel went into the lead, and Alonso went into second place. Around the same time, Adrian Sutil, Jean-Éric Vergne and Giedo van der Garde were involved in a collision. Vergne eventually retired on lap 16, with damage caused by a puncture. Sutil would remain in 13th place, stuck behind Nico Hülkenberg for most of the race. Meanwhile, Fernando Alonso was complaining about his DRS system not working properly. It was in fact stuck open. He pitted to get the wing fixed. However, when trying to overtake, it got stuck open again, and was forced to remain without DRS for the rest of the race. He eventually finished 8th as a result. There was drama between the two McLarens of Jenson Button and Sergio Pérez. The two went onto the radio, and complained about each other battling aggressively for the past few laps. Button fell to 10th by the closing stages, while Pérez managed to get into 6th, only two seconds ahead of Webber and Alonso, and only 6 tenths behind Lewis Hamilton at the finish. Rosberg had fallen rapidly down the field, and would barely finish in the points, in 9th. Paul di Resta on the other hand, was more successful. He was running in third place at the finishing stages, before Romain Grosjean took the honours with just a few laps remaining. Grosjean's teammate Kimi Räikkönen managed to get into second place, and stay there until the end of the race. Vettel was challenged by him, but he held his own until the flag had fallen, taking his second victory of the season. Felipe Massa on the other hand, had a disappointing weekend. He qualified well in 4th place, but during the race, dropped to 15th place due to two tyre failures.

Classification

Qualifying

Notes:
 — Lewis Hamilton was given a five-place grid penalty for an unscheduled gearbox change.
 — Mark Webber was given a three-place grid penalty for his role in causing an avoidable accident with Jean-Éric Vergne at the previous round of the championship.
 — Valtteri Bottas and Pastor Maldonado recorded identical times during Q1. As Bottas set his time before Maldonado, he was considered to have placed higher than Maldonado, and so advanced to Q2 while Maldonado was eliminated.
 — Esteban Gutiérrez was given a five-place grid penalty for causing an avoidable accident with Adrian Sutil in the previous race.

Race

Championship standings after the race

Drivers' Championship standings

Constructors' Championship standings

 Note: Only the top five positions are included for both sets of standings.

See also 
 2013 Bahrain GP2 Series round

Footnotes

References

External links

Bahrain
Bahrain Grand Prix
Grand Prix
April 2013 sports events in Asia